Leutnant Karl Odebrett was a German World War I flying ace credited with 16 aerial victories.

Biography
See also Aerial victory standards of World War I

Karl Odebrett was born in Schneidemuhl on 31 July 1890.

He was a prewar pilot, earning civilian pilot's license no. 659 on 9 February 1914. As the war burgeoned, he volunteered for military service in aviation on 4 August 1914. He underwent military pilot training at Fliegerersatz-Abteilung 5 (Replacement Detachment 5). After that, he was posted to Flieger-Abteilung 47 (Flier Detachment 47) in Russia in 1915. On 18 October 1915, he shot down a Russian airplane for his first aerial victory.

He was wounded on 24 May 1916. On 25 July, he was switched to Flieger-Abteilung Artillerie 215 (Flier Detachment (Artillery) 215)), another German unit stationed in Russia. Here he was assigned a Fokker fighter, but had no success. On 11 November 1916, he was transferred to the Western Front and posted to Jagdstaffel 16 (Fighter Squadron 16). He would not score another victory until 19 June; that win sparked a string of five more, including three on 20 August. However, just three days after his seventh triumph on 4 September, he was wounded in the thigh by antiaircraft shrapnel fragments. He healed at Fliegerersatz-Abteilung 2 (Replacement Detachment 2) until 6 December 1917. Then he was appointed to command Jagdstaffel 42, which he did until war's end. He would shoot down nine more enemy airplanes in 1918, six of them fighters. With his sixteenth confirmed victory on 29 September, he had claims pending for five more victories. As 20 victories was the criterion for award of Germany's highest decoration for victory, an application for Odebrett's award was submitted in October, about a month before the Armistice. However, he never received the award.

Karl Odebrett died of liver failure in Caracas, Venezuela on 13 February 1930.

Awards

 Prussia: Royal House Order of Hohenzollern: 28 April 1918

 Prussian: Iron Cross, First and Second Class

 Bavaria: Order of Military Merit Fourth Class with Swords

 Austro-Hungary: Bronze Bravery Medal

Notes

Reference

 Above the Lines: The Aces and Fighter Units of the German Air Service, Naval Air Service and Flanders Marine Corps, 1914–1918. Norman Franks, Frank W. Bailey, Russell Guest. Grub Street, 1993. , .

Further reading

 Albatros Aces of World War 1.  Norman L. R. Franks. Osprey Publishing, 2000. , .

 Fokker D VII Aces of World War 1, Part 2. Norman Franks, Greg VanWyngarden. Osprey Publishing, 2004. , .

1890 births
1930 deaths
German World War I flying aces
Luftstreitkräfte personnel
Recipients of the Iron Cross (1914), 1st class
People from Piła
Deaths from liver failure